Piirpauke is a Finnish musical group combining free jazz, flamenco, mbalax, Arabesque, carnatic, romantic, modern, classical, humppa, impressionist, hindustani, salsa, Amharic, Lappjoik, Tibetan, Balkan, Karelian, Finnish, national romantic and rock music influences (among others) in their compositions.

The band was founded in 1974 by the keyboardist-saxophonist Sakari Kukko, who is the only original member left in the band today. In addition to a large number of Finnish musicians, several musicians from various countries have also played in Piirpauke.

The name "Piirpauke" comes from an Sakari Kukko's Karelian father and means a noise or a racket.

The band has released 20 studio albums as well as several live and compilation albums. In October 2010 their album Koli peaked number one at the World Music Charts Europe. Piirpauke's best known song in Finland is Konevitsan kirkonkellot (The Church Bells of Konevets), based on a traditional Karelian melody. It is named after the Konevsky Monastery in the Konevets island of Lake Ladoga. The song was covered by heavy metal band Sentenced in their 2002 album The Cold White Light. In Central Europe the biggest hit is so far "Swedish Reggae".

The most active period was 1979–1993, when Piirpauke was touring regularly especially in Central Europe. A typical venue was a big jazz, rock and world music festival, or a big club like Fabrik in Hamburg-Altona. The same stages were occupied by the biggest names of those days like Miles Davis, Astor Piazzola, Ravi Shankar and Nirvana, just to mention a few from different genres. A typical tour would last about a month with 30 gigs, the record being 45 concerts in one month.

The latest album "Hali" has been released in 2019.

Band members 
Sakari Kukko – saxophone, piano, keyboards, vocals
Eerik Siikasaari – bass
Rami Eskelinen – drums
Ismaila Sané – percussion, vocals
Nicholas Rehn – guitar

Selected former members 
Hasse Walli – guitar (1974–1978)
Jukka Tolonen – guitar (1987)
Jukka Orma – guitar

Guest members 
Sheila Surban – vocals
Meissa Niang – vocals

Discography

Studio albums 
Piirpauke (1975)
Piirpauke 2 (1976)
Yö Kyöpelinvuorella (1980)
Birgi Bühtüi (1981)
Kirkastus (1981)
Ilahu Illalla (1984)
The Wild East (1986)
Algazara (1987)
Zerenade (1989)
Tuku Tuku (1991)
Terra Nova (1993)
Ave Maria (1996)
Laula sinäkin (1998)
Kalevala Spirit (2000)
Sillat (2002)
Laulu laineilla (2003)
Kalabalik (2006)
Koli (2010)
Ilo (2012)
Juju (2018)Hali (2019)

Live albums and compilations 
Piirpauke Live (1978)
Historia of Piirpauke Vol. 1 (1978)
Live in der Balver Höhle (1981)
Soi vienosti murheeni soitto (1982)
Live in Europe (1983)
Global Servisi (1990)
Metamorphosis (Live 1977–1995) (1995)
Ikiliikkuja – Perpeetum Mobile (2004)

References 

Finnish folk musical groups
Finnish world music groups
Finnish progressive rock groups
Jazz fusion ensembles
Musical groups established in 1974